The Tidbinbilla River, a perennial stream that is part of the Murrumbidgee catchment within the Murray–Darling basin, is located in the Australian Capital Territory, Australia.

Location and features
Tidbinbilla River rises on the eastern slopes of the Brindabella Ranges in the south-west of the Australian Capital Territory (ACT), below Billy Billy Rocks in Tidbinbilla Nature Reserve, within Namadgi National Park. The creek flows generally north-east before reaching its confluence with Paddys River, south-west of Tuggeranong Town Centre. The creek descends  over its  course.

See also

 List of rivers of Australia

References

 

Rivers of the Australian Capital Territory
Murray-Darling basin